24 Hours in Police Custody is a British television documentary series shown on Channel 4. It primarily follows Bedfordshire Police as they investigate cases in Luton. The programme is made by The Garden Productions; the same production company that makes 24 Hours in A&E.

The first series of seven episodes aired in late 2014. Filming took place at Luton Police Station over a six-week period using more than 80 cameras. Channel 4 commissioned further series, with the second airing in early 2015. A few episodes have taken place wholly or partly elsewhere in Bedfordshire and in Cambridgeshire. Series 10 began broadcasting on 22 March 2021.

Episodes
All ratings are from BARB. Episodes are set in Luton, unless otherwise noted.

Series 1

Series 2

Series 3

Series 4

Series 5

Series 6

Series 7

Series 8

Series 9

Series 10

Specials (2020-23)

References

External links 
 
 
 

2014 British television series debuts
2010s British crime television series
2010s British documentary television series
2020s British crime television series
2020s British documentary television series
Channel 4 documentary series
Documentary television series about policing
English-language television shows
Luton
Television series by ITV Studios
Television shows set in Bedfordshire